Shorea dealbata is a species of plant in the family Dipterocarpaceae. The species name is derived from Latin (dealbatus = whitewashed) and refers to the pale undersurface of the leaf.

Description
It is a main canopy tree, up to 30 m tall, found in kerangas forests on white sand terraces and on sandstone plateau.

Distribution
It is found in Sumatra, Peninsular Malaysia and Borneo where it is threatened by habitat loss. It is found within at least one protected area, Bako National Park in Borneo.

Wood
The timber is sold under the trade name white meranti.

References

dealbata
Trees of Sumatra
Trees of Peninsular Malaysia
Trees of Borneo
Critically endangered flora of Asia
Taxonomy articles created by Polbot